Golek may refer to several places in Slovenia:

 Golek, Črnomelj, a settlement in the Municipality of Črnomelj
 Golek, Krško, a settlement in the Municipality of Krško
 Golek pri Vinici, a settlement in the Municipality of Črnomelj